The Proletarian Party of America (PPA) was a small communist political party in the United States, originating in 1920 and terminated in 1971. Originally an offshoot of the Communist Party of America, the group maintained an independent existence for over five decades. It is best remembered for carrying forward Charles H. Kerr & Co., the oldest publisher of Marxist books in America.

Organizational history

Formation

The Proletarian Party of America (PPA) emerged from the Socialist Party of Michigan, based in Detroit in 1920, but the organization's story dates to a few years prior to this event. The Michigan party, the state affiliate of the Socialist Party of America (SPA), was won over to a unique Left Wing ideology during the years of American participation in World War I.

The key figure in the Michigan organization which later became the PPA was a Scottish born shoe store owner named John Keracher, in association with a tool and die maker named Dennis Batt and radical activists Al Renner and H. M. Wicks. At Keracher's behest, the Socialist Party of Michigan eschewed all participation in electoral politics, instead favoring Marxist theoretical study to prepare the working class for the task of revolutionary leadership. Throughout the years of 1918 and 1919, the party established a network of Marxist study circles called "Proletarian Universities," with the movement particularly strong in Detroit, Chicago, and Rochester, New York.

At the 1919 State Convention of the Socialist Party of Michigan, Keracher was elected head of the state organization and an amendment was adopted by the assembled delegates calling for the expulsion from the Socialist Party of Michigan of anyone who engaged in electoral politics. Keracher, Batt, and other Michiganders were prominent as well in the Left Wing Section of the Socialist Party, a formal faction deeply inspired by the Russian Revolution which was engaged in the attempt to "win the Socialist Party for the Left Wing."

The Left Wing Section organized candidate slates for each of the electoral districts of the SPA and made use of bloc voting by sympathetic branches of the party's language federations to achieve results. The outgoing National Executive Committee of the SPA cried election fraud, however, and refused to tally the results of the 1919 party election or to leave office on July 1, the appointed date. Instead, the outgoing NEC went on the offensive with a series of suspensions of language federations and the expulsion of the Michigan party, ostensibly for violation of the national constitution of the SPA for the anti-political provisions adopted at the 1919 state gathering.

Keracher and the Michigan socialists allied with the suspended language federations in calling for immediate formation of a Communist Party of America, as opposed to the tactics advocated by Alfred Wagenknecht and L.E. Katterfeld of the NEC of continuing the fight to its conclusion at the 1919 Emergency National Convention of the SPA, scheduled for August 30 in Chicago. Wagenknecht, Katterfeld, and their associates wound up bolting the Emergency National Convention to establish the Communist Labor Party of America, while Keracher, Batt, and the federations formed a rival Communist Party of America. Two years of bitter struggle followed between these competing Communist organizations.

The idiosyncratic Michiganders were a poor match for the disciplined and highly orthodox Communists of the federations led by Alexander Stoklitsky, Oscar Tyverovsky, and Nicholas Hourwich of the Russian Communist Federation and Joseph Stilson of the Lithuanian Communist Federation. Early in 1920, a split ensued, due in part to the decision of the Michigan group to continue the public operation of the Proletarian Universities and to publish their monthly journal, The Proletarian, outside of the control of the Central Executive Committee. The Communist Party's Executive Secretary, C.E. Ruthenberg, recalled the necessary change of the Communist Party to an underground organization after the Palmer Raids of January 1920 as the root cause of the problem    The Proletarian group was still part of the Communist Party in January 1920 after the raids. I personally went to Detroit to reorganize the CP and conferred with [Al] Renner, [A.J.] MacGregor, and [John] Keracher. They refused to become part of an underground party. They were dropped out of the CP in February 1920 because they refused to have any part in the reorganization."      The expelled Michigan "Proletarian University" would soon establish themselves as the Proletarian Party of America.

The new party attempted without success to gain affiliation with the Communist International for a few years before eventually abandoning the mission. In 1922, the unified CPUSA attempted to recruit the PPA into its legal arm, the Workers Party of America and the Trade Union Educational League on its own terms, to no avail.

The Proletarian Party and Charles H. Kerr & Co.

Keracher's work with Detroit's Proletarian University had brought him into close contact with Charles H. Kerr, founder of Charles H. Kerr & Co., the largest Marxist publishing house in the United States. Keracher became a member of the Kerr Board of the Directors in 1924 and in 1928 Charles Kerr sold him the bulk of his controlling shares in the firm. Thereafter, the Proletarian Party controlled the operations of Kerr & Co., publishing a number of Keracher's works, including How the Gods Were Made (1929), Producers and Parasites (1935), The Head-Fixing Industry (1935), Crime: It's Causes and Consequences (1937), and Frederick Engels (1946).

Owing to poor finances, few other new Kerr titles were ever published by the PPA, although the backlist of the company was no doubt invaluable in maintaining the organization's solvency.

H. M. Wicks wound up returning to the Communist Party of America, where he was known as a bitter factionalist. Dennis Batt retired from radical politics after a time, to become a labor journalist and staunch supporter of the American Federation of Labor. The banner of the PPA and Charles H. Kerr & Co. was carried forward by Al Wysocki following Keracher's retirement as National Secretary in 1954.

Publications

The official organ of the PPA was a monthly magazine called The Proletarian, which originally served a newsheet for the left wing inside the Socialist Party of Michigan. The Proletarian launched in May 1918 and continued to be issued each month until July 1931, when it was superseded by Proletarian News, which was launched in 1932 and terminated in May 1961  (Vol 30  No. 1 Whole 318). Both publications were monthlies. During its final years, Proletarian News was produced via mimeograph owing to the small size of the party membership.

In 1923 the party briefly experimented with a four page weekly Labor Digest: Devoted to the Working Class Struggle for Power. The newspaper last twelve issues from June 2, 1923 to September 22, 1923.

Throughout its history, the group also published an irregular mimeographed internal discussion newsletter called Proletarian Bulletin, as well as a short-lived publication for its youth section, Proletarian Youth.

Electoral politics

The Proletarian Party periodically ran its own candidates for electoral office, particularly in the state of Michigan, where it retained some organizational viability. In 1932 the party ran two candidates in that state, Al Renner for Governor and Anthony Bielekas for Secretary of State.

Decline and demise

The party suffered two known splits in the 1930s. During one in the early 1930s a faction of the party's youth group split off to join with a group of German Left Communists to form the United Workers Party, which soon changed its name to the Council Communists.   In 1937 a group disagreeing with its attitude toward the Soviet Union split and formed the Marxist Workers Party.

In 1953, Al Wysocki succeeded John Keracher as National Secretary of the PPA. The organization remained based in Chicago, but showed a steady decline in interest and participation, withering to the point that by 1964 only two locals remained — Chicago and Flint, Michigan.

The Proletarian Party was effectively terminated with the death of National Secretary Wysocki in 1971.

Legacy

The papers of the Proletarian Party of America are housed in the Special Collections department of the University of Michigan at Ann Arbor. Over 20 linear feet of material is included in the collection, including correspondence files, newspaper clippings, financial documents, publications, and printer's slugs for original artwork.

Prominent members

See also
 Charles H. Kerr Publishing Company

Footnotes

Publications

 The Proletarian. Detroit and Chicago. (1918-1931) —Tabloid monthly newspaper in 1918, thereafter monthly magazine.
 Proletarian News. Chicago. (1931-1961) —Tabloid monthly newspaper, later mimeographed.
 Labor Digest. Chicago. (June to Sept. 1923) —Short-lived broadsheet propaganda paper.
 Proletarian Bulletin. San Francisco, CA. —Mimeographed internal discussion bulletin.

Further reading

 Tim Davenport, "Formation of the Proletarian Party of America, 1913-1923: Part 1: John Keracher's Proletarian University and the Establishment of the Communist Party of America," Corvallis, OR: author, May 2011.
 Theodore Draper, The Roots of American Communism. New York: Viking Press, 1957.
 Warren W. Grimes, "The Proletarian Party of America." Department of Justice/Bureau of Investigation memorandum, July 20, 1921. Corvallis, OR: 1000 Flowers Publishing, 2006.
 Oakley C. Johnson, Marxism in United States History Before the Russian Revolution (1876–1917). New York: Humanities Press, 1974.
 "The Early Socialist Party of Michigan: An Assignment in Autobiography," Ann Arbor, MI: The Centennial Review, v. 10, no. 2 (Spring 1966), pp. 147–162.
 John Keracher, "Death of Al Renner," Proletarian News, vol. 18, no. 9, whole no. 198 (Sept. 1949), pp. 2, 8.
 Allen Ruff, "We Called Each Other Comrade": Charles H. Kerr & Company, Radical Publishers. Urbana, IL: University of Illinois Press, 1997.

External links
 Tim Davenport, "The Proletarian Party (1920 - 1930)", Early American Marxism website, www.marxisthistory.org/
 Proletarian News. PDF issues, 1956-1961.

Political parties established in 1920
Defunct communist parties in the United States
Political parties disestablished in 1971
1920 establishments in Michigan
1971 disestablishments in the United States